John Ernest Townend (12 June 1934 – 18 August 2018) was a British politician who was a Member of Parliament for the Conservative Party.

Early years
The son of Charles Hope and Dorothy Townend, he was born on 12 June 1934 in Kingston upon Hull, Yorkshire, and educated at Hymers College in Hull. He studied accountancy from 1951 to 1957 as an articled clerk, and received the Plender Prize for the top prize when he became a Chartered Accountant. He then served in the Royal Air Force as a commissioned Pilot Officer from 1957 to 1959. In the latter year, he joined his family business as commercial secretary and finance director, becoming managing director (1961–1979) and then chairman of House of Townend wine merchants in Hull. He was Chairman of the Yorkshire and Humberside Wine and Spirit Merchants' Association (1975–76). In 1977, he became an Underwriter at Lloyds.

Politics
Townend was active in local politics and unsuccessfully contested the parliamentary seat of Hull North at the 1970 general election. He was then elected to Humberside County Council in 1973, becoming the Leader of the Conservative Group and shadow Chairman of the Policy Committee. He also became a member of the Conservative National Advisory Committee on local Government. He subsequently became Leader of the county council, Chairman of its Policy Committee, and member of the Policy Committee of the Association of County Councils, 1977. He was a member of Hull City Council from 1966 to 1974.

At the 1979 general election, Townend was elected as the Conservative Party Member of Parliament for Bridlington, East Riding of Yorkshire, a seat which he held until his retirement in 2001. He served as Secretary of the Conservative Back-bench Finance Committee and was a member of the Select Committee on Treasury and Civil Service affairs and Vice-Chairman of the Back-bench Finance Committee. He was also Principle Private Secretary to Hugh Rossi, the Minister of Pensions and the Disabled. He became Chairman of the Small Businesses Committee, a Fellow of the Industry and Parliament Trust, and a member of the Executive Committee of IPU. His main interests while in Parliament were Treasury and taxation, small businesses, employment, and Southern Africa.

Views on immigration
Townend was renowned for his outspoken views on race and immigration. In 1984, he suggested that foreigners employed in industries should be replaced by unemployed Britons, and in 1989 he stated that "England must be reconquered for the English. They (Muslims opposed to Salman Rushdie's Satanic Verses) should go back from whence they came." In 2001, shortly before his retirement as an MP, he became engulfed in a row within the Conservative Party when, referring to a statement by Foreign Secretary Robin Cook that there was no such thing as a British race, he said that his constituents in Bridlington would not agree, and asked whether Cook therefore thought instead that the British were a "mongrel race". He was chairman of the right-wing 92 Group.

Personal life 
Townend married Jennifer Ann Lawson in 1963. The couple had two sons and two daughters. Outside politics, he listed his recreations as swimming and tennis. He lived in Beverley, East Riding of Yorkshire, and was a member of the Conservative-affiliated Carlton Club.

He died on 18 August 2018, aged 84.

References

External links 
 

1934 births
2018 deaths
Conservative Party (UK) MPs for English constituencies
People educated at Hymers College
Politicians from Kingston upon Hull
UK MPs 1979–1983
UK MPs 1983–1987
UK MPs 1987–1992
UK MPs 1992–1997
UK MPs 1997–2001
Members of Humberside County Council
British Eurosceptics